The 2022–23 Texas Longhorns men's basketball team represents the University of Texas at Austin in the 2022–23 NCAA Division I men's basketball season. They are currently led by interim head coach Rodney Terry and play their home games at the Moody Center in Austin, Texas as members of the Big 12 Conference. The Longhorns play at the newly-built Moody Center after playing at Frank Erwin Center for 45 years. 

On December 12, 2022, head coach Chris Beard was suspended without pay after an early morning arrest for third-degree felony domestic assault on his fiancée. Associate head coach Rodney Terry began serving as acting head coach starting with the December 12th game versus Rice. 

On January 5, 2023, Beard was officially terminated by Texas athletic director Chris Del Conte; Terry continues as acting head coach for the remainder of the season.

Previous season

Season outlook
Heading into the 2021–22 season, there was a lot of excitement surrounding the program after the hiring of former Texas Tech head coach Chris Beard. Texas came into the season ranked number 5 in both the AP Preseason Poll and the USA Today Coaches Poll, further invigorating the hype. Also, there was a lot of roster turnover heading into the season with Beard landing 6 of the top 31 transfers in the transfer portal, and only 1 high school recruit in Jaylon Tyson. In Beard's inaugural season, The Longhorns finished the 2021–22 season at 21–11. During the regular season, Texas finished with a record of 21–10, 10–8 in conference play, and 11–2 in non-conference play. Furthermore, the Longhorns were 3–8 against top-25 competition. Texas went 16–3 at home, 4–7 on the road, and 1–1 at neutral sites. This was the Longhorns first 20-win season since the 2018-19 season, they went 21–16 that year. However, the season did have its ups and downs. Additionally, Jaylon Tyson and Tre Mitchell suddenly departed the team mid-season, and Texas lost their last 2 games of the regular season with an early exit in the Big 12 tournament, being eliminated in the first round by TCU 60–65.

Big 12 tournament
Texas entered the Big 12 tournament as a 4-seed. They faced off against 5-seed TCU where they were defeated 60–65, giving them a 6-seed heading into the 2022 NCAA Division I men's basketball tournament.

NCAA tournament
Texas entered the NCAA tournament as a 6-seed, facing off against 11-seed Virginia Tech. Against Virginia Tech, Texas won 81–73. Furthermore, Texas's victory against Virginia Tech marked their first win in the NCAA tournament since 2014. In the round of 32, Texas faced off against 3-seed Purdue losing 71–81, ending their season.

Offseason

Returning players

Departures

Outgoing transfers

Coaching staff departures

Acquisitions

Incoming transfers

Recruiting classes

2022 recruiting class

2023 recruiting class

Coaching Staff Additions

Preseason

Award watch lists 
Listed in the order that they were released

Big 12 media poll

Source:

Preseason All-Big 12 teams

Source:

Roster

Source:

Roster Outlook

(*)Redshirt

Schedule and results

|-
!colspan=9 style=|Exhibition

|-
!colspan=9 style=|Regular Season

|-
!colspan=12 style=| Big 12 Tournament

|-
!colspan=9 style=|NCAA Tournament

Source:

Awards and honors

Source:

Player Statistics

Rankings

*AP does not release post-NCAA Tournament rankings

References

Texas Longhorns
Texas Longhorns
Texas Longhorns
Texas Longhorns men's basketball seasons
Texas